Alpoyeca is one of the 81 municipalities of Guerrero, in south-western Mexico. The eponymous municipal seat is Alpoyeca. The municipality covers an area of 155.4 km².

In 2005, the municipality had a total population of 5,848.

References

Municipalities of Guerrero